Mauriceville is a census-designated place (CDP) in Orange County, Texas, United States. The population was 2,983 at the 2020 census. It is part of the Beaumont–Port Arthur Metropolitan Statistical Area.

Geography
Mauriceville is located at  (30.215616, -93.873095).

Historical development
The site was established when the two lines known as Texarkana and Fort Smith Railway and the Orange and Northwestern Railway were built in 1898 and 1902 respectively. This community was named for Maurice Miller, the son of the Orange and Northwestern's first president. 
The post office was opened in 1906, and initially, the lumber industry would be the primary center of the local economy. With the local timber supply becoming diminished, other resources such as rice and dairy farming would become the area's economic focus.

Demographics

As of the 2020 United States census, there were 2,983 people, 1,043 households, and 865 families residing in the CDP.

As of the census of 2000, there were 2,743 people, 939 households, and 754 families residing in the CDP. The population density was 322.4 people per square mile (124.5/km2). There were 1,021 housing units at an average density of 120.0/sq mi (46.3/km2). The racial makeup of the CDP was 95.44% White, 0.36% African American, 0.66% Native American, 0.07% Asian, 2.52% from other races, and 0.95% from two or more races. Hispanic or Latino of any race were 5.87% of the population.

There were 939 households, out of which 44.1% had children under the age of 18 living with them, 67.0% were married couples living together, 8.7% had a female householder with no husband present, and 19.7% were non-families. 16.2% of all households were made up of individuals, and 6.4% had someone living alone who was 65 years of age or older. The average household size was 2.92 and the average family size was 3.27.

In the CDP, the population was spread out, with 31.4% under the age of 18, 7.9% from 18 to 24, 32.4% from 25 to 44, 21.2% from 45 to 64, and 7.1% who were 65 years of age or older. The median age was 32 years. For every 100 females, there were 107.6 males. For every 100 females age 18 and over, there were 104.2 males.

The median income for a household in the CDP was $52,500, and the median income for a family was $56,422. Males had a median income of $40,608 versus $24,554 for females. The per capita income for the CDP was $18,388. About 7.3% of families and 10.6% of the population were below the poverty line, including 17.5% of those under age 18 and none of those age 65 or over.

Culture 
The Texas state legislature designated Mauriceville as the "Crawfish Capital of Texas" in 1983.  The previous year, the town's budding crawfish farming industry had been profiled by the New York Times.  The town holds an annual Crawfish Festival each April.

Education
Mauriceville is served by the Little Cypress-Mauriceville Consolidated Independent School District.

Notable person
James Douglas Latham, a spree killer from Mauriceville. Latham and his partner George York were executed by hanging on June 22, 1965. Their sentence was carried out at the Kansas State Prison for the crime of killing Kansas resident Otto Ziegler, one of seven murders committed by the pair.

Climate
The climate in this area is characterized by hot, humid summers and generally mild to cool winters.  According to the Köppen Climate Classification system, Mauriceville has a humid subtropical climate, abbreviated "Cfa" on climate maps.

References

External links
 

Census-designated places in Orange County, Texas
Census-designated places in Texas
Beaumont–Port Arthur metropolitan area